Gregory S. "GC" Coleman (September 25, 1944 – February 5, 2006) was an American drummer and musician who was a member of the Winstons and the drummer of the Amen break, a famous drum solo taken from the Winstons' 1969 recording "Amen, Brother". This solo is the most frequently sampled drum loop in modern music and is used in genres from hip hop to drum and bass and beyond.

Apart from sales of the original recording, Coleman never received any royalties from the widespread use of the sample, despite songs that used or interpreted his sample appearing on albums that made millions.  He died homeless and in poverty in Atlanta, Georgia in 2006.

Early life
Gregory S. Coleman was born in September 1944, one of five children. He was a member of the Mount Calvary Baptist Church and graduated from Armstrong High School in Richmond, Virginia, in 1962. While in high school, he was a dynamic drum major for the school band and formed his own band, called GC Coleman and the Soul Twisters. He later drummed for the Marvelettes of Motown, for Otis Redding, and Curtis Mayfield and The Impressions. He later moved to Washington, D.C. where he joined The Winstons.

He also performed drums on the 1969 album Hammer with the Washington DC band Hillow Hammet.

He later moved to Atlanta, Georgia, where he recorded with Brick.

Death and legacy
Coleman died in Atlanta in February 2006.  According to Richard Spencer, the bandleader of the Winstons, he was homeless and living in poverty at the time.  Coleman was twice married and is survived by a daughter and step daughter.

In the days after Coleman's death, a Youtube video discussing the history of the Amen Break and its subsequent usage was uploaded, which has been viewed over 6 million times as of March 2023.

His Amen Break is the most used drum loop in music history.

References

1944 births
2006 deaths
Rhythm and blues drummers
Musicians from Atlanta
African-American drummers
20th-century American drummers
American male drummers
20th-century American male musicians
20th-century African-American musicians
21st-century African-American people